Kapralov is a Russian masculine surname, its feminine counterpart is Kapralova. Notable people with the surname include:

Andrey Kapralov (born 1980), Russian swimmer
Kristina Kapralova (born 1995), Kazakhstani handball player
Vítězslava Kaprálová (born 1915), Czech composer

Russian-language surnames